The 2002 West Asian Football Federation Championship took part in Syrian Capital of Damascus. Iraq won the final against Jordan 3–2 after extra time coming back from 0–2 at half time. The 6 entrants were Iraq, Iran, Jordan, Palestine, Lebanon and host nation Syria. The draw was held on 13 August in Kuala Lumpur.

Venue

Group stage

Group A

Group B

Knockout phase

Semi-finals

Third place match

Final

Champion

Statistics

Goalscorers

External links 
 RSSSF Page on the tournament

 
2002 in Asian football
2002
2002
2002–03 in Syrian football
2002–03 in Jordanian football
2002–03 in Iranian football
2002–03 in Iraqi football
2002–03 in Lebanese football
2002 in Palestinian football